Cylindromyia bicolor is a European species of fly in the family Tachinidae.

Distribution
This species is present in Europe, in Russia, in the Middle Asia and in Iran.

Habitat
These insects mainly inhabit dry meadows, bushes, edges of wood, marshes, parks and gardens.

Description

These small flies have a grayish thorax and very elongated, cylindrical red abdomen, with a black longitudinal band at the base and discal bristles at the tergites 2 - 4. The large compound eyes are dark brown. Wings are partly smoked. Calyptra are large and  white. Legs are black.

Biology
Adults can be found from mid July to October, with a peak in August. They feed on nectar and pollen of flowers of various local plants, but especially on Apiaceae. Larvae of this species are endoparasites of Rhaphigaster nebulosa (Pentatomidae). The females lay their eggs on their hosts, usually one egg per bug.  Then the larvae enter  by the abdomen the interior of  juvenile pentatomids, where they develop. They pupape on the ground after winter.

References

External links
 Les ionsectes
 INaturalist
 Peter Preus

Phasiinae
Diptera of Europe
Insects described in 1812
Endoparasites